Odontella sinensis, also known as the Chinese diatom, is a marine, unicellular species of diatom in the family Triceratiaceae.

References

Coscinodiscophyceae